Strahwalde is a village and a former municipality in the district Görlitz, in Saxony, Germany. Since 1 January 2010, it is part of the town Herrnhut.

References

Former municipalities in Saxony
Herrnhut